In phonetics and phonology, an intervocalic consonant is a consonant that occurs between two vowels. Intervocalic consonants are often associated with lenition, a phonetic process that causes consonants to weaken and eventually disappear entirely. An example of such a change in English is intervocalic alveolar flapping, a process (especially in North American English and Australian English) that, impressionistically speaking, turns t into d, causing (e.g.) metal and batter to sound like medal and badder, respectively. (More precisely, both /t/ and /d/ are pronounced with the alveolar tap .) Some languages have intervocalic weakening processes fully active word-internally and in connected discourse: e.g. Spanish /d/ regularly pronounced  in both   "all" and   "the dune" (but  if the word is pronounced alone).

Phonetics
Phonology